The Geological Museum was a geology museum on Øster Voldgade, at the northeast corner of the University of Copenhagen Botanical Garden, in Copenhagen, Denmark. Like the botanical garden, the museum was part of the wider array of centers belonging to the Natural History Museum of Denmark. The museum was officially renamed Natural History Museum of Denmark in 2020. The building houses special exhibits but also facilitates research and study as part of the University of Copenhagen, with some of the museum staff actively partaking in research worldwide—for instance, in Greenland.

History 
The Geological Museum opened in 1772 as the "Universitetets Nye Naturaltheater" (The New Natural Theatre of the University) and contains specimens which have been in museum collections for more than 300 years. Its original location was in Nørregade, but in 1893 the museum moved into the current building, which was newly built to house the museum. From 1810 to 1976 the name of the museum was Mineralogisk Museum.

Collections 
The collections at the Geological Museum have been built up through centuries and include large collections of minerals, fossils, petrology, and meteorites.

Exhibitions 

The Geological Museum featured changing exhibitions as well as permanent ones such as The Mineral Exhibition where the minerals are presented in a crystal chemical order starting with elements such as gold and silver and ending with silicates such as feldspar and zeolites.

The Agpalilik meteorite, a part of the Cape York meteorite weighing some 20 tons, can be seen in the museum courtyard. Also on exhibit is a small rock from the Taurus-Littrow region of the Moon, brought back by the Apollo 17 astronauts in 1972.

References

External links 
 The Natural History Museum of Denmark
 The Geological Museum in Copenhagen (Archived)

Museums in Copenhagen
Geology museums in Denmark
University museums in Denmark
University of Copenhagen